The Authentic Radical Liberal Party ( or PLRA) is a centrist liberal political party in Paraguay. The party is a full member of Liberal International. The liberales, as they are known, are the leading opposition to the dominant conservative Colorado Party. They have taken this position since the end of the Alfredo Stroessner dictatorship in 1989. They are the political successors of the Liberal Party, which traces its history back to 10 July 1887.

The party was formed by Domingo Laíno, Carmen Casco de Lara Castro, Carlos Alberto González, Miguel Ángel Martínez Yaryes, and others in 1978, in opposition to the Constitutional Amendment of 1977 which imposed no term limits to the re-election of the Paraguayan president.

In the presidential elections of 2008, the party achieved victory over the Colorado Party for the first time in 61 years through a political alliance headed by leftist Fernando Lugo and composed by other left-wing political parties. At the 2008 legislative elections, the party won 26 seats in the Chamber of Deputies and 14 seats in the Senate. They were approximately tied with the Colorados in the number of seats won in the Chamber of Deputies and the Senate.

Following the June 2012 impeachment of Fernando Lugo, the governing alliance fell apart, and Vice-President Federico Franco took over the presidency, thus exercising the first all-PLRA government in Paraguay. The PLRA has remained in opposition since 2013.

Electoral history

Presidential elections

Vice presidential election

Chamber of Deputies elections

Senate elections

Notes 
The Democratic Alliance was an alliance of the Authentic Radical Liberal Party and the National Encounter Party

References

See also 
 List of liberal parties
 Liberal democracy
 Liberalism and radicalism in Paraguay

Liberal International
Liberal parties in South America
Political parties established in 1978
Political parties in Paraguay
Radical parties
Centrist parties in South America
1978 establishments in Paraguay